Richard Wayne Fields (born November 30, 1960) is an American broadcaster, spokesman, announcer, and meteorologist. He is best known for a seven-season stint in which he announced for the American version of The Price Is Right.

Early life and education
Fields was born in Bay Village, Ohio, and raised in Avon, Ohio, before moving to Clearwater, Florida, in 1976. He graduated from the University of Florida Gainesville in 1983 with a Bachelor’s degree in broadcasting. While attending UF, Fields was diagnosed with both testicular cancer and lymphoma, both of which he survived. Between 1995 and 1999, he was the announcer of the Florida Lottery game show Flamingo Fortune.

In early 2000, Fields returned to college at Mississippi State University to study meteorology and later became a successful Los Angeles television weatherman. Rich completed his MSU Meteorology internship at WFLA-TV in Tampa, Florida. In 2002, Fields was offered the morning weather position at KPSP-LP in Palm Springs, California. Fields was later promoted to Chief Meteorologist for KPSP and was charged with the weather forecasts on the 5:00 p.m., 6:00 p.m., and 11:00 p.m. newscasts for the station until May 2004.

Career

From 2004 to 2010, he was the announcer of the American version of The Price Is Right, following the death of longtime announcer Rod Roddy. The announcement of Fields' hiring was made official on April 8, 2004. During a question-and-answer segment with then-announcer Johnny Olson at a taping of Price Is Right in 1978, Fields asked how he could get Olson's job. Olson brought Fields onstage and asked him to give an example of how he would call a contestant to "Come on down!" In 2007, Fields appeared together with Bob Barker on a fictional episode of The Price Is Right in an episode of How I Met Your Mother.

From 2010 to 2016, Fields had been a staff meteorologist for the CBS-owned-and-operated television stations KCBS-TV and KCAL-TV in Los Angeles, California. Fields was also a regular voice delivering weather forecasts on radio stations KNX, KFWB, and K-EARTH 101 in Los Angeles. This was a natural fit as Fields was a veteran disc jockey, having had music radio shows for over a decade on KKHR, KNX-FM, KODJ, and KCBS-FM, all of which were broadcast out of CBS's Columbia Square on Sunset Boulevard in the 1980s and 1990s.

Fields served as the announcer of the All-Star summer tournament series Gameshow Marathon from May 31 until June 29, 2006, on CBS. It was during this seven-show series that Fields set a record for announcing the most televised game show titles in a single season. This U.S. version was hosted by actress and talk show host Ricki Lake.

In 2009, Fields had his own comedy web series on YouTube called Rich Fields Gone Wild where he gets into some crazy situations in his daily life with Lou Ferrigno (The Incredible Hulk) and Adam West (Batman) as guest stars in those particular episodes.

Fields also served as the announcer on 55 episodes of Wheel of Fortune in 2010 following the death of Charlie O'Donnell, and provided post-production voice-over work for over 11 weeks of episodes, plus specials.

Rich Fields has worked as a radio personality (starting back in 1979) at some 16 radio stations across the country, including markets like Los Angeles, California, and Tampa, Florida. From 2017 until 2020, Fields held down the Afternoon Drive position on Q105 (WRBQ-FM). However, after nearly three years on the air at Q105, Fields and nearly the entire air-staff were let go, during staffing cutbacks due to the COVID-19 pandemic.

In November 2021, Rich Fields was hired as a meteorologist at WTSP (10 Tampa Bay), the CBS affiliate in Tampa, Florida, On February 16, 2023, Fields announced he was leaving television to become a motivational speaker.

References

External links
 Official website
 

1960 births
American radio DJs
American television meteorologists
Clearwater High School alumni
Game show announcers
Living people
People from Bay Village, Ohio
Television personalities from Cleveland
The Price Is Right
University of Florida alumni